The Bally Sports Regional Networks are a group of regional sports networks in the United States owned by Diamond Sports Group, a joint-venture company of the Sinclair Broadcast Group and Entertainment Studios. The  naming rights to the network were sold to casino operator Bally's Corporation.

The networks were formerly known as Fox Sports Networks and operated by News Corporation for most of their existence. They were acquired by Diamond Sports from The Walt Disney Company in 2019, as Disney was required to divest them by the U.S. Department of Justice as a condition of their own acquisition of 21st Century Fox.

Launched on March 31, 2021, the networks carry regional broadcasts of sporting events from various professional, collegiate and high school sports teams. Through 19 owned-and-operated networks and several other affiliates, Bally Sports programming is available to all or part of at least 45 states, with the only notable lack of coverage existing in the Philadelphia media market, Northern California, and most of New England.

History

Beginnings

The networks of Bally Sports have a long history, with the origins of several of the networks dating to the 1980s and 1990s, as affiliates of the Prime Network (and to a lesser degree SportsChannel). In 1996, News Corporation and Liberty Media (the owner of Prime Network) announced that the Prime Sports networks would be rebranded under the new "Fox Sports Net" brand; the Prime Sports-branded affiliates were officially relaunched as Fox Sports Net on November 1 of that year. In 1997, News Corp and Liberty Media also purchased a 40% stake in Cablevision/NBC's SportsChannel networks which led those networks being rebranded as part of Fox Sports Net in early 1998 and bringing the total number of owned or affiliate networks to 18. In the years that followed, a series of other acquisitions and launches of new networks (along with a few closures) resulted in 22 owned and operated networks.

Acquisition by Diamond Sports Group from Disney
On December 14, 2017, The Walt Disney Company announced their intent to acquire 21st Century Fox for $52.4 billion after the spin-off of certain businesses into a new entity (initially dubbed "new Fox", but ultimately named Fox Corporation). While the acquisition was originally slated to include Fox Sports' regional operations (which, presumably, would have been re-aligned with Disney's ESPN division), the Justice Department ordered that they be divested within 90 days of the completion of the acquisition due to the concentration of the market that ESPN would hold.

Sinclair Broadcast Group was mentioned as the most likely buyer for the other FSN networks, but would need the assistance of a private equity firm to help raise the cash needed for the purchase. The group's other sports properties included Stadium—a national sports network distributed via over-the-air digital television and internet streaming, Tennis Channel, as well as Marquee—a then-upcoming RSN devoted to the Chicago Cubs.

On May 3, Sinclair officially announced that via its subsidiary Diamond Sports Group, it had agreed to purchase the networks for $10.6 billion, pending regulatory approval. At the same time, it was also revealed that Entertainment Studios would hold an equity stake in the company and serve as a "content partner".

The sale was completed on August 22, 2019 and included 21 of the 22 networks. The networks continued to temporarily use the Fox Sports branding under a transitional license agreement with Fox Corporation; Sinclair CEO Chris Ripley stated that there were plans to eventually rebrand them under either a new name, or to "partner with a brand who wants more exposure". There were also plans to increase non-event programming, and emphasis on sports betting in its programming.

Due to a clause in the original sale, Yankee Global Enterprises had a right of first refusal to purchase Fox's share in YES Network. On August 29, 2019, an investor group including the Yankees, Sinclair, Amazon, and The Blackstone Group purchased Disney's 80% stake in the network for $3.47 billion. Sinclair's share of the network is 20%.

FuboTV dropped the channels in January 2020, and YouTube TV and Hulu + Live TV followed in October 2020. On November 4, 2020, Sinclair took a $4.23 billion write-down on the FSN purchase.

Rebranding as Bally Sports 
On November 17, 2020, it was reported by Sportico that Sinclair was considering rebranding the networks via a naming rights agreement, and was reportedly in talks with multiple companies involved in sports betting. The next day, Sinclair announced that it had entered into an agreement with casino operator Bally's Corporation to acquire the naming rights under a 10-year deal. This agreement will include integration of Bally's content on the channels and other Sinclair properties (including its television stations Stadium and Tennis Channel), and a warrant giving Sinclair the option to acquire a 14.9% stake in Bally's Corporation, and up to 24.9% if performance criteria are met.

On January 27, 2021, Sinclair announced that the networks would be rebranded as Bally Sports on March 31. Fox Sports Carolinas and Fox Sports Tennessee were discontinued, with any unique sports programming moved to the Bally Sports South and Southeast channels. To better reflect their target markets, Prime Ticket and SportsTime Ohio were also rebranded as Bally Sports SoCal and Bally Sports Great Lakes, respectively.

In preparation for the rebrand, new studio sets were constructed at all of FSN's outlets, while Drive Studio produced a new on-air graphics package built upon its existing work for Marquee. On-air graphics feature a new consistent scorebug in the bottom-left of the screen, which is combined into the ticker. Executive vice president Michael Connelly explained that the setup was designed to eventually allow for the integration of sports betting-related information such as lines and props.

On Opening Day, the newly-rebranded channels aired a joint special, Bally Sports Big Opening Day. It was produced by Stadium, hosted by Michael Kim, Bally Sports SoCal’s Kristina Pink and Bally Sports Southeast’s Eric Collins, and featured coverage of teams and events across Bally Sports and Sinclair's sports networks.

On June 23, 2022, Bally Sports soft-launched a direct-to-consumer service known as Bally Sports Plus (or Bally Sports+) in selected markets. It is expected to launch nationally in the remainder of the networks' footprint on September 26.

On February 15, 2023, Diamond Sports Group, the parent company of Bally Sports, failed to make a $140M interest payment, instead opting for a 30-day grace period to make the payment. During this grace period, Diamond Sports also missed a rights payment to the Arizona Diamondbacks. On March 14, 2023, Diamond Sports filed for Chapter 11 Bankruptcy.

Networks

Owned-and-operated

Affiliates

Teams by network

 Team-related shows and/or game replays only
† Occasional game telecasts

National programming
 College football games (produced by sister network Stadium and distributed by Bally Sports)
 College basketball games (produced by Stadium and distributed by Bally Sports)
 AutoNation Orange Bowl Basketball Classic (produced by Bally Sports)
 Atlantic Coast Conference telecasts (including college basketball, football, soccer, lacrosse, softball, baseball and field hockey; produced by Raycom Sports in tandem with Bally Sports, these telecasts are distributed through separate agreements)
 Missouri Valley Conference telecasts (including college basketball, soccer, lacrosse, softball, baseball and field hockey games; produced by LTN Global Communications in tandem with Bally Sports, distributed exclusively in the Midwest)
 West Coast Conference Men's and Women's college basketball
 Association of Volleyball Professionals (owned by Bally's Corporation)
 Inside the Association (produced by Stadium)
 World Poker Tour events
 Kwik Trip Holiday Face-Off (college hockey, produced by Bally Sports)
 Tennis tournaments (produced by Tennis Channel)
U.S. Army Bowl
 Live on the Line (produced by Stadium)
 The Rally (produced by Stadium)
 American Ninja Warrior

Related services

Bally Sports+
Bally Sports+ is Bally Sports's over-the-top subscription streaming platform, which offers livestreams and market-specific video-on-demand content from its individual regional networks. In addition to offering live game telecasts from the Bally Sports regional networks, the service also provides game replays, team-centered studio programs, outdoor programming, and selected programs syndicated to the network’s national and regional feeds.

In December 2020, Sinclair announced plans to launch a direct-to-consumer streaming service based around the linear Bally Sports networks. The service was originally targeted for a 2021 launch, though it was delayed due to Bally Sports needing to negotiate over-the-top streaming rights with the teams. Sinclair CEO Chris Ripley stated that the service was meant to target cord cutters, whom the company felt were underserved in the regional sports market.

Bally Sports+ was soft-launched on June 23, 2022, initially available to customers residing in the service areas of Bally Sports Kansas City, Bally Sports Detroit, Bally Sports Florida, Bally Sports Wisconsin, and Bally Sports Florida/Bally Sports Sun —the five markets where Bally Sports was able to negotiate streaming rights to the local MLB team. The service launched three weeks after NESN launched NESN 360, the first DTC streaming service ever offered by an American regional sports network, on June 1. 

The service—which is sold for $19.99/month or $189.99/year—uses the same infrastructure as the Bally Sports app, and was initially available on smartphones and tablet devices. Due to regional rights restrictions, the service is only available to users in markets serviced by a network owned or affiliated with Bally Sports.

In August 2022, Bally Sports announced that Bally Sports+ would expand to the rest of its markets on September 26, 2022.

See also
 Bally Sports app

References

External links

 

Sinclair Broadcast Group
Entertainment Studios
SportsChannel
Prime Sports
Companies that filed for Chapter 11 bankruptcy in 2023
Television channels and stations established in 2021
2021 establishments in the United States
Fox Sports
2019 mergers and acquisitions